Sugarloaf Reservoir is a reservoir at Christmas Hills 35 km north-east of Melbourne's central business district.

History
The structure was completed by Thiess Brothers in 1981, and has a total capacity of 96 gigalitres.

Sugarloaf Reservoir includes a major pumping station and water treatment plant. Sugarloaf uses water pumped from the Yarra River at Yering Gorge and water transferred from Maroondah Reservoir via the Maroondah aqueduct. Sugarloaf is important in meeting peak summer demand in the northern parts of Melbourne.

In February 2010, the North South Pipeline was completed, connecting the Goulburn River to the reservoir. It is the government's policy that water from the Goulburn only be used in times of critical human need: when Melbourne's total water storages are less than 30% full on 30 November of any year.

The Sugarloaf Reservoir is operated by Melbourne Water.

Recreational facilities

Sugarloaf Sailing Club
The Sugarloaf Sailing Club operates on the reservoir year round. The club can be found on Ridge Road off the Eltham-Yarra Glen Road. The club runs over 40 races throughout the year in four series, "Winter", "Spring", "Summer" and "Autumn". There is a strong racing fraternity at Sugarloaf who can be found on the lake on race days, rain, hail or shine. New members can use the boats from the club fleet without further charges. The club also conducts sailability on the first Wednesday of the month during the warmer months. Sailability is sailing for all including the young, the elderly and disabled, uses dinghies which are unsinkable, uncapsizable and good fun.

Recreational fishing and walks

Sugarloaf Reservoir is also a very popular waterway for recreational fishing. Rainbow and brown trout, redfin, roach and European carp can be caught in these waters all year round. No natural bait or berley is permitted, there are signs posted around the reservoir stating this. This is due to the reservoir being an integral component of Melbourne's domestic water supply.
There have been studies conducted that suggest that the mercury levels in the redfin (and most likely other predatory fish in the reservoir) are higher than is regarded safe for human consumption. Sugar loaf also boasts some amazing views at the peaks of the loops of the reservoir where you can see all the way to the CBD.

References

Reservoirs in Victoria (Australia)
Melbourne Water catchment
Rivers of Greater Melbourne (region)
Dams completed in 1981
Embankment dams
1981 establishments in Australia
Yarra Ranges